Bells Bridge is a rural locality in the Gympie Region, Queensland, Australia. In the  Bells Bridge had a population of 197 people.

Geography 
The Bruce Highway passes through the locality from the east to the north-east, where it has a junction with the Wide Bay Highway which passes through the location to the north-west.

The Mary River flows through the locality from south-east to north-east, eventually flowing into the Great Sandy Strait.

Most of the locality is the Brooyar State Forest, except for the eastern and north-eastern parts which are farmland supporting cropping and grazing.

History 
The locality presumably takes its name from the Bell's Bridge built at O'Leary's Crossing over the Mary River, which was opened by the Minister for Lands, Joshua Thomas Bell, on Thursday 28 May 1908. The bridge was funded by the Widgee and Kilkivan Shire Councils, the Queensland Government and other public donations. It was named after Bell for the support he had given them in obtaining the funding for the bridge.

Bell's Bridge State School opened on 8 June 1926. It closed on 11 November 1932.

Bells Bridge was a locality in the Shire of Cooloola prior to the 2008 amalgamation into the Gympie Region.

In the  Bells Bridge had a population of 197 people.

References 

Gympie Region
Mary River (Queensland)
Localities in Queensland